The second World University Netball Championship was organised by the Fédération Internationale du Sport Universitaire (FISU) and held in Miami, United States. It is a women's indoor tournament with a maximum of 12 teams competing. 12 competitors and 5 officials are allowed per team.

Silver medallist in 2012 South Africa won the tournament from Jamaica. Australia came home with the bronze.

Participants

 
  England

Competition

Day 1
South Africa beat USA 93 - 18 
Uganda beat Trinidad & Tobago 73 - 37 
Jamaica beat Australia 42 - 38 
South Africa beat Namibia 74 - 30 
Trinidad & Tobago beat USA 55 - 39

Day 2
Uganda Beat Australia 
Jamaica beat England 
Namibia beat USA 
South Africa beat Trinidad & Tobago 
Australia beat England  
Jamaica beat Uganda

Quarter-finals
South Africa beat England 71 - 30 
Australia beat Namibia 61 - 44 
Uganda beat Trinidad & Tobago 50 - 22 
Jamaica beat USA 98 - 9

Semi-finals
South Africa beat Uganda 
Jamaica beat Australia

Consolation games
Trinidad & Tobago beat England 
Namibia beat USA

7th/8th final
England beat USA

5th/6th final
Namibia beat Trinidad & Tobago 52 - 38

Bronze medal game
Australia beat Uganda

Gold medal game
South Africa beat Jamaica 43 - 39

Final placings

References

 Day 1 newsletter. FISU 14 July, 2016 
 Day 2 newsletter. FISU 15 July, 2016 
 Day 3 newsletter. FISU 16 July, 2016 
 Day 4 newsletter. FISU 17 July, 2016 
 Day 5 newsletter. FISU 18 July 2016 

2016 in netball
2016
Netball
Netball in the United States
2016 in American women's sports
July 2016 sports events in the United States
Sports in Miami
Women's sports in Florida